Xi Sigma Pi is an international honor society for Forestry and related sciences. It was founded on November 24, 1908, "to secure and maintain a high standard of scholarship in forestry education, to work for the improvement of the forestry profession, and to promote a fraternal spirit among those engaged in activities related to the forest."  The mission has been expanded in recent years to award students of similar achievement in the natural resources related to the forested environment.

History
After its foundation on 24 November 1908 at the University of Washington, Xi Sigma Pi remained a local chapter until 1915, when discussion and a new constitution led to an opening for national expansion. The Beta chapter was founded at Michigan State in 1916, followed by the University of Maine in 1917, thus spanning the nation. Over 40 chapters have now been established.

The Society of Xi Sigma Pi was admitted to membership in the Association of College Honor Societies in 1965, temporarily dropped membership in the late 1990s, but was reinstated at the 2017 ACHS convention.

Government is by convention, held biennially in conjunction with the annual meetings of the Society of American Foresters. Each biennium, a chapter is designated the National Chapter, from which national officers of that biennium are chosen.  The current governing chapter is the Zeta chapter at Oregon State University in Corvallis, Oregon.

The 1991 edition of Baird's Manual noted the Society had 24,000 initiates, 42 active chapters, and 1 inactive chapter.

Chapters

The Society has established 46 chapters since 1908, 34 of which remain active.

Membership requirements
Undergraduates eligible for election as active members of a chapter must have completed a minimum of 74 semester hours of scholastic work (or 110 quarter-system hours), be ranked in the upper 25 percent of their class, and have attained a scholastic average equivalent to "B" or higher letter grade. The student must have completed 10 of his or her semester hours (15 quarter-system hours) in forestry resources management classes. An individual's personality and character are scrutinized no less closely than his or her scholastic rank. He or she must have shown a creditable interest and activity in his or her curriculum, and give promise of attaining high professional achievement. Election to membership is dependent upon a composite rating rather than upon scholastic ability alone. The following list of character and personality traits should be read by the presiding officer before voting upon the candidates (as part of a frank discussion of merit):
Honesty
Friendliness
Morality
Dependability
Industry
Leadership
Willingness to cooperate

Provisions are made for graduate students and faculty to join, with the intent that chapters encourage all levels of membership.

Chapters may adopt more stringent requirements than the national guidelines.

Scholarships and charitable programs
The Society seeks to encourage the long-term health of the profession by contributing to the endowment fund of the Society of American Foresters.

To support scholarship, the Society established a national technical paper contest, with regional scholarship awards that recognize excellence in forestry academic achievement. Up to five regional winners are selected by participating chapters.

Publications
Society proceedings and announcements are issued through the Society of American Foresters, and/or on individual chapter websites. See List of Xi Sigma Pi Chapters.

Traditions
The badge of the Society is an oval key or pin, at the option of the local chapter (or individual member not connected with a chapter), on which key or pin are engraved a fir tree surmounting an inverted crescent. Surrounding the tree are the capital Greek letters Xi Sigma Pi, and beneath it an oval containing the Greek letters Pi Alpha (ΠΑ). The colors of the society are  Green and  Gray (Note that until 1992 they had been Green and Navy).

References

Notes

Bibliography

External links
Xi Sigma Pi (ΞΣΠ) website: XiSigmaPi.org.  See Alpha chapter, or individual chapter websites.
Website of the Society of American Foresters

Honor societies
Forestry organizations
Student organizations established in 1908
1908 establishments in Washington (state)
Association of College Honor Societies